KUPK (channel 13) is a television station licensed to Garden City, Kansas, United States, affiliated with ABC and owned by Lockwood Broadcast Group. The station's news bureau and advertising sales office are located on East Schulman Avenue in Garden City, and its transmitter is located near Copeland, Kansas.

KUPK is part of the KAKEland Television Network (KTN), a regional network of eight stations (three full-power, two low-power, two translators and one digital replacement translator) that relay programming from Wichita ABC affiliate KAKE (channel 10) across central and western Kansas; KUPK incorporates local advertising and news inserts aimed at areas of southwestern Kansas within the Wichita–Hutchinson Plus television market, as well as portions of the Oklahoma Panhandle within the Amarillo market.

History

On October 28, 1964, KAKE signed on KUPK-TV to serve as a satellite station for southwestern Kansas. KUPK was named as its letters could be used to form the word "Kup-Kake." The studio was originally located at Copeland, where the main transmitter remains today.

In 1992, with local news inserts having expanded to 15 minutes inside KAKE's 6 and 10 p.m. newscasts, KAKE announced that a new regional news program for western Kansas, known as KTN West, would be launched to air on KUPK and KLBY in Colby.

Currently, the satellite stations air all KAKE newscasts in their entirety with no local inserts, but reporters can send in stories from western Kansas via KUPK's studio on the east side of Garden City.

Subchannels
The station's digital signal is multiplexed:

On September 7, 2012, KAKE and its satellites began carrying the classic television network MeTV on their second digital subchannels.

On January 28, 2022, KAKE and its satellites began broadcasting three networks owned by the E. W. Scripps Company: Bounce TV on its third subchannel, Defy TV on its fourth subchannel, and Newsy (now Scripps News) on its fifth subchannel.

References

External links
 KAKE official website

Lockwood Broadcast Group
ABC network affiliates
MeTV affiliates
Bounce TV affiliates
Defy TV affiliates
Scripps News affiliates
Television channels and stations established in 1964
1964 establishments in Kansas
Television stations in Kansas
Finney County, Kansas